A watering hole is a geologic depression in which water collects and where animals come to drink.

Watering hole may also refer to:

 A tavern, bar, pub, or other local drinking establishment
 Watering hole attack, a computer attack strategy that targets a website (the "watering hole") where intended victims congregate

See also
Water hole (disambiguation)
Water well, an excavated hole that is dug to provide water
Watergate (architecture), a fortified gate to allow water into a fortification
Destination spa, a resort facility for 'taking the waters'
Bar (disambiguation)
Pub (disambiguation)